Jean Luciano (2 January 1921 – 7 July 1997) was a French football player and manager who played as a midfielder. He coached OGC Nice, Sporting CP, Vitória S.C., SC Toulon, AS Monaco FC and Gazélec Ajaccio.

References

External links
 Profile on French federation official site
 

1921 births
1997 deaths
French footballers
France international footballers
Association football midfielders
Ligue 1 players
La Liga players
OGC Nice players
Stade Français (association football) players
CO Roubaix-Tourcoing players
Real Madrid CF players
UD Las Palmas players
Pays d'Aix FC players
French football managers
OGC Nice managers
FC Lausanne-Sport managers
Sporting CP managers
Vitória S.C. managers
SC Toulon managers
AS Monaco FC managers
Gazélec Ajaccio managers
French expatriate footballers
French expatriate football managers
French expatriate sportspeople in Spain
Expatriate footballers in Spain
French expatriate sportspeople in Monaco
Expatriate football managers in Monaco